Federico Papini (born 24 November 1999) is an Italian professional footballer who plays as a right back for  club Crotone.

Club career
In August 2019, he joined Serie D club Lucchese. Lucchese won the Group A this season, and was promoted to Serie C. Papini made his professional debut on 19 October 2020 against Como.

On 24 August 2022 he joined Crotone on a two-year contract.

References

External links
 
 

1999 births
Living people
Footballers from Florence
Italian footballers
Association football fullbacks
Serie C players
Serie D players
A.C. Tuttocuoio 1957 San Miniato players
A.S.D. Sangiovannese 1927 players
Lucchese 1905 players
F.C. Crotone players